Greenberg Carville Shrum (GCS) is an American political campaign strategy group.

People
 Stan Greenberg (GCS Pollster), now of Greenberg Quinlan Rosner
 James Carville (GCS Strategist), political pundit, advisor to president Bill Clinton
 Bob Shrum, a political consultant
 Tad Devine (GCS Advertising Consultant)

See also
 Our Brand Is Crisis (2005 film)
 Our Brand Is Crisis (2015 film)

References

American political activists